The Škoda Scala is a small family car or compact hatchback manufactured by Czech automaker Škoda Auto. The car is intended to fit between the Fabia and the Octavia, and to be a competitor to the cars in the C-segment hatchback segment. The Scala was unveiled in December 2018. An online configurator was accessible in January 2019, and sales officially began in May 2019.

Earlier, it was assumed that the new car would be called Felicia, Garde, Spaceback or Popular, however the name Scala was announced on October 15, 2018. Scala means "stairs" or "ladder" in Latin, according to the car maker it presents a big step forward in the compact car segment. This name has already appeared several times in the past, including the Renault Scala, which was sold between 2012 and 2017, and the Zastava Skala, a small family car between 1971 and 2008.

Overview 

After four years in the development stage, the Scala official premiere was held on 6 December 2018 in Tel Aviv, Israel, as Škoda  is the best-selling European brand in the country. The design was previously previewed as the Škoda Vision RS concept at the 2018 Paris Motor Show.

It is based on a stretched version of the MQB A0 platform that underpins the Volkswagen Polo and SEAT Ibiza, which means the car has C-segment dimensions while built above a B-segment platform in order to be competitively priced compared to its rivals. As the result, the Scala has a  wheelbase, which is  longer compared to the Volkswagen Golf. Škoda claims this translates into competitive amount of cabin space, especially for the rear passengers. The usage of the cheaper A0 platform also pushed the use of torsion beam rear suspension, saving costs over the complex multi-link systems.

Four trim levels are available in Europe, which are S, SE, SE L and Monte Carlo.

It is the first Škoda car with a constant internet connection, which works with a built-in SIM with permanent 4G connectivity which allows owners to unlock the car using a smartphone and enables satnav map updates to be updated automatically. It is also equipped with 10.2 inch digital instrument panel, 9.2 inch center screen, blind spot monitor which senses cars up to 70 meters, lane, front and park assist, crew protect assist, rear traffic alert, adaptive cruise control and 467 litre boot space.

The Scala also features a Sport Chassis Control which offers two different suspension tunings. The chassis is 15 mm lower and in addition to a Normal mode, also has a Sport mode with valve-adjustable shock absorbers that would give the car a firmer ride. Drivers can switch between the two settings via the Driving Mode Select menu.

Powertrain 
The Scala is available with a range of three turbocharged petrol engines. In 2019, a CNG G-Tec powertrain is added as an option. The car was originally launched with a diesel engine available, but this was dropped in 2020.

Sales

Awards
The Škoda Scala received the Red Dot Design Award for March 2019. In the leading automobile magazine in Germany, Auto Bild, the Scala defeated its rivals, the Mazda3, the Ford Focus, and the Volkswagen Golf.

References

External links 

 Official website

Scala
Compact cars
Hatchbacks
 
Cars introduced in 2018
2020s cars
Front-wheel-drive vehicles